Barbara Sibbald is a Canadian novelist and an award-winning freelance journalist based in Ottawa, Ontario, Canada.  She has published two works of fiction, The Book of Love:  Guidance in Affairs of the Heart (General Store Publishing House, 2011), and Regarding Wanda (Bunkhouse Press, 2006), which was short-listed for the Ottawa Book Award.

Career
She has published numerous short stories in anthologies and literary journals such as Shift, The Capilano Review, Antigonish Review and The New Quarterly.  Two of her short stories have been nominated for the Journey Prize in fiction writing.  She has also been the recipient of a City of Ottawa Arts Grant (for Regarding Wanda) and a Canada Council writing grant (for The Book of Love), and has participated in the Banff Centre Writing Studio workshops.

Sibbald's nonfiction journalism includes extensive writing on health, medical and lifestyle issues, published in the Canadian Medical Association Journal, where she also works as a Deputy Editor. She has also been a regular contributor to the Ottawa Citizen and the Huffington Post, and is a frequent contributor to other major Canadian media outlets, such as The Globe and Mail and Chatelaine magazine. 

She was twice cited for the Michener Award for meritorious public service in journalism; has been recognized with the Canadian Association of Journalists' investigative journalism prize (2006); and has twice won gold awards for breaking news from the Canadian Business Press.

See also
 Canadian Medical Association Journal

References

External links 
 

1965 births
21st-century Canadian novelists
21st-century Canadian women writers
Canadian non-fiction writers
Canadian women non-fiction writers
Canadian women journalists
Canadian women novelists
Carleton University alumni
Journalists from Alberta
Journalists from Ontario
Living people
People from Red Deer, Alberta
Writers from Alberta
Writers from Ottawa